The Alaskan is a 1924 American silent adventure drama film based on a novel by James Oliver Curwood set in northwoods country, as his novels tend to be, in this case Alaska. The film was produced and released by Paramount Pictures and directed by Herbert Brenon. The picture stars Thomas Meighan, Estelle Taylor and an early role by Anna May Wong.

Cast

 Thomas Meighan as Alan Holt
 Estelle Taylor as Mary Standish
 John Sainpolis as Rossland
 Frank Campeau as Stampede Smith
 Anna May Wong as Keok
 Alphonse Ethier as John Graham
 Maurice de Canonge as Tautuk (as Maurice Cannon)
 Charles Ogle as Lawyer

Preservation
With no prints of The Alaskan located in any film archives, it is a lost film.

See also
List of lost films

References

External links

 
 
 

1924 films
American silent feature films
Films directed by Herbert Brenon
Films set in Alaska
Lost American films
1920s adventure drama films
American adventure drama films
American black-and-white films
Paramount Pictures films
Northern (genre) films
1924 lost films
Lost adventure drama films
1924 drama films
Films based on novels by James Oliver Curwood
1920s American films
Silent American drama films
Silent adventure drama films
1920s English-language films